Karabalyk is a district of Kostanay Region in eastern Kazakhstan. The administrative center of the district is the urban-type settlement of Karabalyk. Population:

References

Districts of Kazakhstan
Kostanay Region